"I Need More of You" is a song written David Bellamy, and recorded by American country music duo The Bellamy Brothers.  It was released in January 1985 as the third single from the album Restless.  The song was The Bellamy Brothers eighth number one country hit.  The single went to number one for one week and spent a total of fourteen weeks on the country chart.

Charts

Weekly charts

Year-end charts

References

1985 singles
1983 songs
The Bellamy Brothers songs
MCA Records singles
Curb Records singles
Songs written by David Bellamy (singer)